is a railway station on the  Osaka Metro Sennichimae Line (Station Number: S23) in Ikuno-ku, Osaka, Japan.

Layout
There is an island platform with two tracks underground.

Surroundings
the headquarters of Rohto Pharmaceutical Co.
Yoshinoya
Gyoza Osho
McDonald's

Bus routes
Buses are operated by Osaka City Bus.

Kita-Tatsumi Bus Terminal
Bus stop 1
Route 18 for  via 
Bus stop 2
Route 13 for  via Oikebashi and Shariji
Subway Kita-Tatsumi
Route 19 for Kami-higashi Sanchome-kita via Subway Minami-Tatsumi and JR Hirano / for Subway Imazato via Ikuno Chuo Byoin

Ikuno-ku, Osaka
Osaka Metro stations
Railway stations in Osaka
Railway stations in Japan opened in 1981